The Texas A&M University Corps of Cadets (often The Corps of Cadets, or simply the Corps) is a student military organization at Texas A&M University. Established with the university in 1876, it is the oldest student organization on campus.

Students who elect to join the Corps must participate in mandatory Reserve Officer Training Corps (ROTC) courses and training for the first three semesters, but they are optional after that. All cadets are required to attend leadership classes in the School of Military Science coordinated by the Commandant's Office. Approximately 45 percent of the members of the Cadet Corps continue with the ROTC curriculum, contract with the military, and receive commissions as officers in the United States armed forces upon graduation. Juniors and seniors who do not have military contracts to receive commissions but wish to remain members of the Cadet Corps are classified as "Drill & Ceremonies" (D&C) cadets. As established under federal law, Texas A&M is one of six U.S. colleges classified as senior military colleges and is the largest.

History
The Corps of Cadets was founded in 1876 with the creation of the all-male, military-focused Agricultural and Mechanical College of Texas under the Morrill Act of 1862. Texas A&M remained a primarily all-male military institution with mandatory membership in the Cadet Corps until 1964, when the school began admitting women. In 1965 Corps membership became voluntary.

Members of the Cadet Corps have served in every conflict fought by the United States since the Spanish–American War. During World War II, Texas A.M.C. produced 20,229 Aggies who served in combat. Of those, 14,123 were commissioned as officers, more than the combined total of the United States Naval Academy and the United States Military Academy during the same timeframe. Over 250 Aggies have served as generals or flag officers, and eight alumni have been awarded the highest United States military award, the Medal of Honor:

Horace S. Carswell, Jr., class of 1938
Thomas W. Fowler, class of 1943
William G. Harrell, class of 1943
Lloyd H. Hughes, class of 1943
George D. Keathley, class of 1937
Turney W. Leonard, class of 1942
Eli L. Whiteley, class of 1941
Clarence E. Sasser, class of 1973

*Sasser was not in the Corps and joined A&M after receiving his Medal of Honor

Early years
For the school's first thirty-one years, through the 1907–08 academic year, the Cadet Corps was organized into one battalion consisting of two to four companies, designated companies "A", "B", "C", and "D". Early on, these were designated "Infantry" companies, but the Commandant ensured that Artillery training was included in the military instruction. The Aggie Band was organized in 1894 as a permanent institution within the Corps. In 1908, with enrollment over 570, a second battalion was added. As enrollment climbed, the Cadet Corps continued to grow to multiple battalions, each with two to four companies, and the Corps became divided into multiple regiments.

The academic year 1916–17 saw the division of the Corps into two regiments. The following year, the two regiments had a total of six battalions composed of eighteen companies and a battery of field artillery. In 1918, enrollment surged to 1,284, almost a fifty percent increase over the previous year. In the 1919–20 school year, a Signal Corps battalion and a Mounted Cavalry battalion (later called a "cavalry squadron") with one cavalry troop were added. An Air Service squadron with one company-sized "flight" was added in the 1920–21 school year.

In the fall of 1923, the Cadet Corps, with a total of 2,091 cadets in twenty-three individual units, became divided between the Infantry Regiment and the Composite Regiment. The Composite Regiment included the Cavalry, Field Artillery, Air Service and Signal Corps units. The Air Corps Squadron (formerly Air Service Squadron) was phased out at the end of the 1927–28 school year. In the fall of 1928, with enrollment at 2,770 cadets, an Engineer Battalion was added, and the following year a third regiment was formed out of the expanded Field Artillery Battalion. A fourth battalion, the Coast Artillery, was added to the Composite Regiment in the fall of 1933.

The Cadet Corps enrollment hit a peak of 2,770 in 1928, but the Great Depression took its toll, and by the fall of 1932 enrollment had fallen to 2,001. But as the Depression waned and the U.S. involvement in the war became imminent, enrollment climbed back to a pre-War total of over 6,500 in the fall of 1941. In 1935, swelling enrollment forced the formation of an Engineer Regiment and a Cavalry Regiment. With these two new regiments, added to the Infantry, Field Artillery and Composite regiments, the Cadet Corps, for the first time in its history, now had a total of 5 regiments, encompassing thirty-two individual units (companies, batteries and troops). That same year, a Chemical Warfare Service Company was added to the Composite Regiment, and the following year a second company warranted the formation of a Chemical Warfare Service Battalion. A sixth regiment, the Coast Artillery Regiment, was added in 1937. In 1939, the Band had grown to the point that it was now divided into two units, the Infantry and Artillery Bands.

In the fall of 1942, as citizens of Texas responded to America's need for military officers, the number of individual military units in the Cadet Corps hit an all-time high with a total of seven regiments of seventeen battalions comprising sixty companies, batteries, and troops, including the Band. The Cadet Corps at Texas A&M sent over 20,229 former cadets into World War II, 14,123 of them as commissioned officers, more than the combined totals of both military academies. By February 1943 enrollment dropped to less than 4,000 as Cadets left school to serve in the U.S. military. The 1944–45 school year saw enrollment drop to as low as 1,600 and the depletion of cadets forced the reorganization of the Corps down to only two regiments (Infantry and Composite) consisting of a total of only 17 companies, batteries and troops, including the two Band units. In 1943, the U.S. Army declared the Mounted Cavalry obsolete, although Cavalry units continued at Texas A&M as mechanized units until the end of the 1949–50 academic year.

Post-World War II
World War II and the demands of the U.S. military took their toll on enrollment. But, with the end of the war, as enrollment surged in the fall of 1946, Texas A&M gained the use of Bryan Air Force Base, which was being closed, and converted a number of its buildings into dormitories. In 1947, all entering freshmen, approximately 1,500, were assigned to the Bryan Air Force Base "Annex" which became essentially a freshman campus. The Cadet Corps reorganized again to accommodate these unusual conditions.

The 1947–48 Cadet Corps consisted of five regiments, a Headquarters Group, and the Band during that academic year. The five regiments (a combined Infantry and Veterans regiment, an Artillery regiment, a combined Air Force and Cavalry regiment, a combined Engineer and Composite regiment, and the "Training Regiment" consisting of nine companies of freshmen), the Headquarters Group and the Band were composed of a total of 35 individual military units.

The 1951–52 academic year saw the organization of the Cadet Corps at is largest in number of individual units. Sixty-six units (companies, batteries and squadrons) were divided among 8 regiments (Infantry, Artillery, Armor/Engineers, First Air Force Wing, 2nd Air Force Wing, Composite Regiment, Seventh Regiment and the Eighth Freshman Training Regiment) consisting of 21 battalions and the Band.

During this post-war era and into the 1950s, the various units of the Corps continued to be identified by their military branch. The traditional branches (Infantry, Field Artillery, Cavalry, Engineers, Coast Artillery, Quartermaster, Ordinance, Signal Corps, Armor, Chemical Corps, Transportation, Army Security, and Army Air Force) continued to be represented. But the strength of air power and the rise of the importance of the U.S. Air Force during this era was evident in the organization of the Cadet Corps as Army Air Corps units became Air Force flights (later squadrons). Veterans companies and flights were formed to separate these older veterans from younger cadets. Beginning in 1948 athletes were organized into their own batteries (later companies) to accommodate special team practice schedules.

That same year, 1948, the Freshman Regiment added a Band Company and four Air Force flights for a total of 12 units. The Eighth Freshman Training Regiment was moved to the main campus in the Fall of 1950, and by 1951, it consisted of a total of 15 freshman companies, batteries and squadrons, each with a branch designation, attached to which was a Senior Battalion of four companies of cadet Seniors. During the 1953–54 school year, over one-third of the 57 Corps units, a total of 21, consisted of Freshmen. The following year, freshmen were incorporated back into the other Corps units.

The 1954–55 school year, saw the Cadet Corps begin to take on the organization (two Army regiments and two Air Force wings, and the Band) that is familiar to most former cadets today. The Band, which in 1939 had divided itself into an Infantry company and an Artillery Battery (Field Artillery Band in 1940), dropped those branch designations in 1947 in favor of the two designations Maroon Band and White Band.

The first unit logos, which later evolved into the now common unit names, began to appear among the Air Force units in the 1955–56 Aggieland yearbook. A few of the Army units began to follow suit in the 1957-58 Aggieland. But, in the 1959–60 academic year, with the complete reorganization of the First and Second Brigades and the official abandonment of the Army Branch designations, the units in the two Army Brigades began to adopt unit nicknames and mascots, or "outfit logos," in earnest.

During the Vietnam War era, the Cadet Corps was composed of two to three Army Brigades, two to three Air Force Wings, and the Band. Each brigade was composed of two or three battalions of three to five companies each, and each Wing was composed of two groups of three to six squadrons each. During this period the Corps was composed of as many as 40 individual companies and squadrons, including the Band.

The Corps welcomed their first female members in the fall of 1974.  At the time, the women were segregated into a special unit, known as W-1, and suffered harassment from many of their male counterparts. Women were initially prohibited from serving in leadership positions or in the more elite Corps units such as the Band and the Ross Volunteers. These groups were opened to female participation in fall of 1985, following a federal court decision in a class-action lawsuit filed by a female cadet; five years later, female-only units were eliminated.

In 1977, Freshman Orientation Week was introduced for incoming fish, culminating in the tradition of the "Fish Review", which has occurred since 1988.

Modern corps 
Today, the Cadet Corps is a coeducational institution, and thirty-seven of its forty-four "outfits" are gender-integrated. Over 2,500 students, including over 300 women are members of the Corps, and, although this is only a small percentage of the overall student population, the Corps remains a highly visible presence on campus, a reminder of the school's origins as an all-male military college. Cadets are active in many campus organizations and are renowned for their school spirit, often called "Keepers of the Spirit."

All military branches are represented in the organization of the Cadet Corps today. It is now composed of three Air Force Wings, three Army Brigades, and three Navy and Marine Regiments, as well as The Fightin' Texas Aggie Band whose members may be affiliated with any military branch.

In December 2018, the Corps of Cadets had the honor, and distinction, of saying their final farewell and salute to George H. W. Bush, the 41st President of the United States of America, as he was laid to rest alongside the late First Lady Barbara Bush and their daughter Robin at the George Bush Presidential Library on the Texas A&M campus.

In 2011, there was the largest freshman class since 1987.  

In the fall of 2013, the corps established a Career Readiness (CR) chain to help prepare cadets for their post-graduation transition into the work force. 

On 28 April 2022, the campaign "March to 3,000" was launched to grow the Corps of Cadets to 3,000 members from around 2,143 in the fall 2021. For the 2023-2024, a reversion to the battalion/group structure for "minor units" was implemented, with there being one major unit per branch of service.

Corps Commandants 

Major Robert Morris (1876–1877)
Captain George Olmstead (1877–1881)
Captain C. J. Crane (1881–1884)
Lieutenant John S. Mallory (1884–1886)
Lieutenant Guy Carleton (1886–1888) 
Lieutenant William Scott (1889–1890)
Lieutenant Benjamin Morse (1890–1894)
Lieutenant George Bartlett (1894–1898)
Colonel John Carter Edmonds (April–July 1898) 
Harry Martin (1898–March 1899)    
Edwin Jackson Kyle (March–May 1899)
Colonel John Carter Edmonds (May 1899 – 1901) 
Captain E. P. Avery (1901–1903)
Captain Herbert Sargent (1903–1907)
Captain Andrew Moses (1907–1911)
Lieutenant Fenton (1911–1912)
Lieutenant Levi Brown (1912 – 1914)
Lieutenant James Hill (1914 – 1916)
Captain C. H. Muller (1916 – 1917)
Colonel C. S. Crane (1917 – 1918)
Colonel C. H. Muller (1918 – 1919) 
Louis Dougherty (1919–1920)
Lieutenant Colonel Ike Ashburn (1920 – 1923)
Colonel Charles Todd (1923 – 1925) 
Lieutenant Colonel P. H. Turnell (1925 – 1927)
Colonel Charles Nelson (1927 – 1932)
Lieutenant Colonel John Mitchell (1932 – 1935)
Colonel Frank Anderson (1935 – 1937)
Colonel George Moore (1937 – 1940)
Lieutenant Colonel James Watson (1940 – 1941)
Colonel Maurice Welty (1941 – 1946)
Colonel Guy Meloy (1946 – 1948)
Colonel Haydon Boatner (1948 – 1951)
Colonel Joe Davis (1951 – 1963)
Colonel D. L. Baker (1963–1967)
Colonel Jim McCoy (1967–1971)
Colonel Thomas Parsons (1971–1977)
Colonel James Woodall (1977–1982)
Colonel Donald Burton (1982–1986)
J. Malon Southerland (1986–1987)
Major General Thomas G. Darling (1987–1996)
Major General M. T. Hopgood (1996–2002)
Lieutenant General John Van Alstyne (2002–2010)
Colonel Jake Betty (2010)
Brigadier General Joe Ramirez (2010–2021)
Colonel Byron Stebbins (2021–2022)
Brigadier General Patrick Michaelis (2022–Present)

Rank

The rank structure of the Cadet Corps is generally based on the Army ROTC cadet rank structure. Today, the ranks are divided by class and, unlike at some other military schools, at Texas A&M a cadet can never be demoted such that a person of a lower class outranks him/her, although this has not always been true. Up through the early 1950s many senior and junior cadets held private rank, although they were accorded privileges and respect commensurate with their class rather than by their rank. Unlike most of the personnel in the U.S. Armed Forces, the rank is always a piece of metal approximately 1 square inch in size affixed to the uniform much like a tie tack, but is never cloth rank sewn onto the fabric.

Freshmen are considered Cadet Privates and, as such, wear no rank, just a brass "A.M.U." symbolizing their affiliation with Texas A&M University. Sophomores hold the ranks of Cadet Private First Class, Cadet Corporal or Cadet Sergeant. Juniors are given cadet NCO rank (Sergeant through Sergeant Major of the Corps) and seniors are Cadet Officers (from Cadet 2nd Lieutenant through Cadet Colonel of the Corps).

The highest-ranking member of the Corps is Reveille X, the school's official mascot. The female American collie is the "First Lady" of Texas A&M and is present at all Texas A&M football games and also attends other A&M functions. Reveille is now cared for by a sophomore cadet from Company E-2, whose position in the Corps is known as the Mascot Corporal. By decree from the US Army after World War II, Reveille holds the honorary rank of Cadet General. As there officially isn't a rank of Cadet General, and there has never been such a rank at any military school, cadets must create the rank insignia (five diamonds) themselves. To create this rank each year, cadets combine cadet lieutenant colonel insignia (two diamonds) with a cadet colonel insignia (three diamonds) and carefully place them together, creating a five diamond insignia.

Class system

As a member of the Corps, a cadet climbs through four classes of seniority. The current Corps of Cadets uniform is unique among military schools, bearing a close resemblance to the US Army uniforms from after World War I to World War II known as Pinks and greens. There are slight differences in the uniform worn by each class year, noted below, including the Senior Boots, calf-skin riding boots harkening back to the US Army cavalry officer's uniform of World War I. All cadets wear the same basic Corps uniform regardless of service affiliation.

Freshmen

Freshman cadets are called "fish".  The first year, the "fish year" is analogous to the experiences of the Rooks at Norwich University, Knobs at The Citadel, Rats of the Virginia Tech Corps of Cadets, Rats at the Virginia Military Institute, Frogs at University of North Georgia, Doolies at the United States Air Force Academy, or Plebes at any of the other U.S. Federal Service Academies.

A fish is easily recognized by the fact that the garrison cap (a.k.a. bider) is plain and not embellished with any braid, or by the black cotton belt. The freshman bider is worn with a deep tuck in the back, which forms a "peak" reminiscent of a fish tail, and first-semester freshmen wear brass "A.M.U." devices on their lapels, rather than the Corps insignia or band lyre worn by upperclassmen. Freshmen and sophomores are also required to wear metal taps on the heels of their shoes; this facilitates marching in step. In addition, male fish must maintain an extremely short hairstyle known colloquially as a "fish cut".

Corps "fish" are not known by their first name and the term "fish" is applied instead. In this use, the word "fish" is always written in lowercase letters. Thus, John Smith would become "fish Smith." A freshman whose last name is not known to the speaker is referred to by the generic name "fish Jones." Corps freshmen introduce themselves to upperclassmen cadets by a formalized procedure known as "Whipping Out," wherein the fish bends his or her arm at the elbow, slaps it against the side of the torso, grasps the upperclassman's hand, and proceeds to recite the prescribed whip-out dialogue (example below).
 fish: "Howdy! fish Jones is my name, Ma'am!" 
 Upperclassman: "Howdy fish Jones, Smith is my name," or commonly "It's Smith."
 fish: "Howdy Ms. Smith, Ma'am! Where are you from Ms. Smith, Ma'am?"
 UC: "I'm from College Station, Texas. What about you, fish Jones?"
 fish: "This fish is from Bryan, Texas, Ms. Smith, Ma'am! What course are you taking Ms. Smith, Ma'am?"
 UC: "I'm taking General Studies. What about you, fish?"
 fish: "This fish is taking University Studies, Ms. Smith, Ma'am! It's nice to have met you Ms. Smith, Ma'am!"

The freshman then "pops to" attention and "sounds off", loudly greeting the upperclassman with "Howdy, Ms. Smith, Ma'am!" From that point on, the freshman is expected to remember the name, hometown, and major of the upperclassman at any future meeting, and is expected to greet the upperclassman appropriately. Fish who do not recall an upperclassman's name must whip out again. Freshmen must also observe a complex set of rules governing when and where whipping out to and greeting upperclassmen is appropriate. For example, fish in the band must whip out to other bandsmen anywhere on campus, but they need not whip out to non-band cadets unless they are on the Quad.

Cadets who started in the same class year are known as buddies, and the term is used throughout a cadet's Corps career and is also applied to special units. As the academic year progresses, some upperclassmen from units other than the freshman's own will begin to "drop handles" with fish, meaning the upperclassman has granted the fish permission to use his or her first name and speak more informally. Some upperclassmen may "drop handles" immediately after meeting fish for the first time; to indicate that upperclassmen intend to "drop handles", they will ask the fish, "What's your mamma call you?" at which point the freshmen will give their true first name. Freshmen are still under obligation to obey orders, even from upperclassmen who have "dropped handles" with them.

Questions from upperclassmen are generally answered with one of the five "fish answers:"
 "Yes, Sir/Ma'am!"
 "No, Sir/Ma'am!"
 "No Excuse, Sir/Ma'am!" (given in response to a "why" question)
 "(Class Year), Sir/Ma'am!" (given in response to a question whose answer is a numeric value, regardless of the actual answer)
 "Sir/Ma'am, not being informed to the highest degree of accuracy I hesitate to articulate for fear that I may deviate from the true course of rectitude. In short Sir/Ma'am, I am a very dumb fish, and do not know, Sir/Ma'am!" (given in response to any question to which the above four answers do not apply; this answer is recited as quickly as possible)
A fish may give a more detailed answer to a question if the upperclassman who asked it says "Really?" The upperclassman may say this after the fish has first recited the appropriate "fish answer," or immediately after asking the question, in which event the freshman may answer the question normally.

Additionally, every fish is also required to know the answers to a wide number of questions including, "What's for chow?", "How many days until Final Review?", and a long list of university history, or "Campusology," questions. Each morning and most evenings, a fish in each outfit will run "Whistle Jock," blowing a police whistle or bugle and announcing impending formations or activities to the unit. The Whistle Jock's announcement may be as simple as naming the upcoming event and the uniform to be worn, or as complex as including the weather, the menu for chow, the Sergeant and/or Officer of the Day, and special announcements requested by upperclassmen. For evening chow, several fish from each outfit run "fish of the Day," setting up their outfit's table(s) at Duncan Dining Hall prior to formation, then returning to the dorms immediately after chow to assist seniors in removing their boots.

Corps fish are not privileged to live in a "room," and their residence in the dorm is thus called a "hole." Likewise, the "roommate" in their dorm is called an "Ol' Lady," though this term is often used throughout a cadet's Corps career. Furthermore, fish are instructed that they are not allowed to like, think, want need, nor feel, and are prohibited from taking "shortcuts" by using abbreviations (PT must be called "physical training," the Quad the "Quadrangle," etc.).  Corps fish sit a mandatory Evening Study Time (EST) during the school week after evening chow. This allows a period of quiet uninterrupted study each night, and fish are periodically checked by their unit's Sergeant of the Day to ensure that they are indeed studying.

Freshman cadets in the Corps must maintain their "holes" in spotless condition at all times, and are prohibited from keeping accessories such as televisions, radios, posters, and even food in these quarters. Freshmen in uniform must also keep a number of unique items on their person, such as nail clippers, slide ruler, white glove or polishing cloth, university I.D. card, and a copy of The Cadence, a guide- and rulebook issued to all freshman cadets; a "disch card," bearing the core values of the Corps of Cadets, is also required. Most units also require their fish to run, rather than walk,  inside the dorms during the academic day, and restrict them to the use of only one side of dormitory hallways (the exact amount of room permitted is usually delineated by floor tiles).

Sophomores
The sophomore year is a busy and hectic second year in the Corps.  Sophomores in the Corps are known as "pissheads", often abbreviated as "head" since cadets do not swear in uniform. Several stories circulate as to the origin of the name. According to legend, the name is derived from an incident in the mid-1900s when a group of freshmen urinated on the heads of several sophomores they had grown tired of. A more recent story credits the nickname to Aggie Bonfire, when sophomores would work on the lower levels of the stack, and the upperclassmen above them would relieve themselves. However, the name predates the stacked bonfire, and it is generally accepted that the name simply refers to the normal demeanor of sophomores in keeping the freshman class in line. A pisshead's primary duty in the Corps is to train and drill the freshmen for Final Review in May, and the pisshead is graded by the performance of their freshmen.

Sophomores can be distinguished by the black braids on their garrison cap, their nylon black belt, and their rank insignia of private first class or corporal.  Much like drill sergeants, the pissheads are responsible for seeing that the fish adapt and excel in Corps life. Pissheads are expected to be perfect examples for their fish, and it is therefore usually considered bad form for a junior or senior to correct a sophomore in view of freshmen. In most outfits, pissheads correct their own mistakes with "As you were," but never "As I was," as the latter is deemed to reflect imperfection.

Juniors
As a junior, the cadet is called a "sergebutt" or more commonly just a butt. The nickname is a result of the serge material used to make the uniform trousers. When cadets wore college issue cotton khaki, it was a junior privilege to purchase tailor made serge uniforms which were easier to maintain and required less ironing. The Corps junior, wearing a white braid on their garrison caps and white cotton belts, often finds this to be the most productive and engaging year in the Cadet Corps. The junior class runs the daily operations of the Corps. Juniors hold the rank of cadet sergeant through cadet sergeant major, depending on the position attained.

Seniors
Senior cadets are often referred to as "zips" (short for "zipperheads"), referring to the black and gold "zipper" braid on the garrison cap. A senior may also be referred to as an "elephant," which derives from the senior class Elephant Walk tradition held the week before the last regularly scheduled football game of the year.  Seniors hold cadet officer rank, from Cadet 2nd Lieutenant to Cadet Colonel of the Corps.

Senior cadets, like all seniors at Texas A&M, may also order an Aggie Ring, the symbol of the university and one's graduating class.

A senior cadet is easily recognized by the distinctive brown calf-skin leather boots, known as senior boots, sabre, and gold braid on the garrison cap. Seniors are the only class allowed to wear their bider without a break or fold in the top seam.

Senior boots
Within the Texas A&M Corps of Cadets, seniors are given the privilege to wear distinctive brown leather boots, known as "senior boots." These boots are one of the most visible and recognizable institutions of the Aggie Corps, and remain one of the lasting images of Texas A&M University.

The tradition of senior boots came about in 1914, when the Corps of Cadets changed uniforms from the West Point style. The seniors wanted a way to differentiate themselves from the other classes, so they began wearing officer boots, which evolved into the senior boots worn today. By 1925, the boot style was integrated into the official cadet uniform, as a "knee-height officer boot, of a light brown or tan." Lucchese's bootery in San Antonio became the main supplier of boots.

By 1932, competition closer to campus sprang up. Joseph Holick, founder of the Fightin' Texas Aggie Band, opened Holick's that year, and his competition soon included Victor's, Russell's, and others. The average price for a pair of boots in 1932 was $32.50. During World War II, due to the leather diversion to the war effort, Aggie seniors had to buy or inherit their boots from former cadets. By 1977, the price had risen to $200.  Today, senior boots are normally ordered during freshman year and cost $700 to $1,900, but 85% of seniors in the Corps still purchase them. Seniors also have the option to apply to borrow a donated pair of boots through prior-worn boots donations from former cadets.

To assist in removing their boots, seniors are allowed to yell "I need a fish!" at which point all available freshmen in the senior's outfit will race—and sometimes fight—to assist.

Uniforms
A variety of uniforms are issued to a cadet, including summer and winter versions of daily uniforms, dress uniforms and field uniforms. The "Uniform of the Day" depends on the weather. For special occasions and events, the uniform is specified in the Field Order or invitation for the event. Special Corps units have special uniforms, such as the Ross Volunteers, the Fish Drill Team and Parsons Mounted Cavalry.

Uniform components

Uniform combinations

Class C — BDU/ACU/OCP
All class years through 2011 - BDU cap, BDU blouse and trousers with Corps brass and brass rank, black combat boots
All classes 2012 on — ACU cap, ACU blouse and trousers with velcro rank centered on chest, tan roughout combat boots
All classes 2025 on — OCP cap, OCP blouse and trouser with velcro rank centered on chest, tan or coyote roughout combat boots
Class B Summer
Tan garrison cap, Class B Summer shirt,  Summer Pants, Black Low-quarter shoes/Senior boots
Class B Winter
Dark tan garrison cap, Class B winter shirt, winter pants, black low-quarter shoes/senior boots
Class Midnights
Dark tan garrison cap or service hat, midnight shirt, winter pants, black low-quarter shoes/senior boots (since 2012, only juniors and seniors are authorized to wear Midnights)

Leadership

Office of the Commandant
Commandant of the Corps–Head of the School of Military Science
Chief of Staff
Assistant Commandants
Academics and International Programs
Discipline
Logistics
Marketing and Communications
Operations and Training
Recruiting
Director of Bands and Music Activities
Director of the Hollingsworth Center for Ethical Leadership
Director of the Sanders Corps of Cadets Center
Head of ROTC Departments
Professor of Military Science (Army Reserve Officers' Training Corps)
Professor of Naval Science (Naval Reserve Officers' Training Corps)
Professor of Aerospace Studies (Air Force Reserve Officers' Training Corps)

Cadet leadership

The Corps has its own cadet commander, a Cadet Colonel, assisted by as Cadet Lieutenant Colonel, as his/her deputy as well as a Chief of Staff and the Corps Sergeant Major. The Corps Staff consists of 25 members including the top four in the corps, and consists of ten senior cadet officers with particular portfolios and their junior assistant sergeants. In 2012, Marquis Alexander of the United States Marine Corps was appointed as the first African American corps commander. In 2016, Alyssa Michalke was chosen as the first female corps commander for the school year. The following year, Cecille Sorio was selected as the second female commander.

The Corps of Cadets is organized in a way that is comparable to that of an army corps.

Corps Staff

 Corps Commander 
 Deputy Corps Commander
 Corps Chief of Staff
 G-1 Officer (Adjutant/Discipline)
 G-2 Officer (Scholastics)
 G-3 Officer (Operations)
 G-4 Officer (Logistics)
 G-5 Officer (Career Readiness)
 G-6 Officer (Inspector General)
 G-7 Officer (Training)
 G-8 Officer (Finance)
 G-9 Officer (Public Relations)
 G-10 Officer (Recruiting)
 Chaplain
 Sergeant Major of the Corps

Major Unit Staff

 Major Unit Commander
 Executive Officer
 Major Unit Staff
 Sergeant Major
Minor Unit Staff
 Minor Unit Commander
 Executive Officer
 Minor Unit Staff
 Sergeant Major

Outfit Leadership

 Outfit Commander
 Executive Officer
 S-1 Officer (Adjutant/Discipline)
 S-2 Officer (Scholastics)
 S-3 Officer (Operations)
 S-4 Officer (Logistics)
 S-5 Officer (Career Readiness)
 S-6 Officer (Inspector General)
 S-7 Officer (Training)
 S-8 Officer (Finance)
 S-9 Officer (Public Relations)
 S-10 Officer (Recruiting)
 Chaplain
 First Sergeant

Corps life

Today, cadets no longer occupy all of the student housing on campus. The Corps is housed only in the dorms located in what is now called " the Quadrangle, a.k.a. "the Quad". They are divided into companies, batteries, and squadrons, and serve as the basic units of the Corps of Cadets. These units are aligned by ROTC affiliation under three Navy/Marine Regiments, three Air Force Wings, three Army Brigades, a mixed military affiliation Task Force, and the Combined Band.

There are normally two Corps formations each day—one in the morning and one in the evening to observe the raising and lowering of the American Flag before marching to Duncan Dining Hall for chow. Individual fish in each unit serve as 'Whistle Jocks" to announce the approach of formations, the Uniform of the Day, and the menu for the next meal.

In addition to normal college classes, cadets participate in daily Corps activities. These can range from intramural sport events, helping the local community, to a 2,500-member formation Corps run around campus. For example, many cadets serve each year on the MSC Student Conference on National Affairs where they hone their leadership skills and knowledge of international and national issues while meeting such speakers as Chairman of the Joint Chiefs of Staff Martin Dempsey in 2015 and Commandant of the Marine Corps Robert Neller in 2017.

Corps Brass

Following the Corps reorganization and dropping of Army branch designations, cadets required a new symbol to be used. The solution to this was the Corps Brass, the class gift from the Class of 1960. Created by cadets from Company F-1, it is used as the symbol for earning full membership in the Corps. All cadets go through the process of earning it during their first year. It is a shield with knight's helm on it with a sword and fasces crossed behind it and scrollwork over the top that says "Per Unitatem Vis," translating to "Through Unity, Strength." These elements represent how the one of the first presidents of the university, Lawrence Sullivan Ross, was described: Soldier (sword), Statesman (fasces), and Knightly Gentleman (knight's helm). To distinguish themselves, cadets in the band do not wear Corps Brass, instead wearing a small brass lyre device. In recent years, bandsmen often combine the lyre insignia with those of the U.S. Army infantry and field artillery branches (crossed rifles and crossed cannons, respectively) on some uniforms to reflect their affiliation with the Infantry or Artillery Bands (these designations having been reintroduced in 1976).

International Excursions Program 
The program, also known as the Corps Global Leadership Initiatives (CGLI) Program, was established in 2011 by the Commandant, Brigadier General Joe Ramirez and consists of three study abroad opportunities after the spring semester. The Australian Defence Force Academy and Helmut Schmidt University have similar programs that see their cadets serve in the corps. In 2019, Royal Air Force Cadet Augustus Altuccini of Swansea University in Wales, became the first foreign cadet from Britain to be exchanged in the corps.

Current Corps structure (2023-2024)

Unit awards 
The following major awards are given annually in connection with the Corps Awards Program:

 Lieutenant General Ormond R. Simpson Award for Most Outstanding Color Guard
 United Services Automobile Association Award for Most Outstanding Major Unit Staff
 Commandant’s Award and Flag for University Activity
 Robert M. Gates Public Service Award
 J.J. Sanchez Award and Flag for Recruiting and Retention
 George P. F. Jouine Award and Flag for Scholastic Achievement
 Major General Bruno A. Hochmuth Award and Flag for Military Achievement
 Taylor A. Gillespie Award and Flag for Most Improved Unit
 President’s Award and Flag for the Most Outstanding Major Unit
 General George F. Moore Award, Plaque, and Flag for the Outstanding Unit

All awards are presented at the annual Family Weekend Review on Simpson Drill Field.

Organizations 
The following are special units within the Corps of which cadets can additionally be members (for example a cadet in D-2 could be a member of the Ross Volunteers, but not the Band).

Ross Volunteers 

The Ross Volunteer Company is the official Honor Guard for the Governor of the state of Texas, and, aside from the Cadet Corps itself, is the oldest student organization in the state of Texas. Started in 1887, the organization was named Scott Volunteers for the President of Texas A&M.  In 1898, the company was renamed for Texas A&M President Lawrence Sullivan Ross. The company lives by the creed, "Soldier, Statesman, Knightly Gentleman."

The company is composed of junior and senior cadets. Cadets are chosen on a basis of honor, humility, and character.  Each fall, approximately 72 junior cadets are selected into the company by the RV seniors.  A critical voting process, undisclosed to outside sources, is conducted to select the new junior inductees.  Once the juniors are inducted into the company, it is composed of those newly selected juniors, 35 seniors holding leadership positions, and the remaining senior members.  All senior RV members are continually welcomed at practices, events, and socials.

Today, the RV uniform is a distinctive white uniform, with yellow trim.  Officers in the RV Company (Commanding Officer, Executive Officer, Administrative Officer, Operations Officer, and three Platoon Leaders) as well as one Non-Commissioned Officer (1st Sergeant) wear a silk red sash around the waist of the white uniform.  The RV Company performs a 3-volley, 21-gun salute at the traditional Silver Taps ceremony and at the annual campus Muster event. In addition, the RV Company marches in several parades each year including the Rex Parade on Mardi Gras in New Orleans, Louisiana.  The RVs serve as the honor guard of Rex, the king of Mardi Gras.  Other duties include Texas Gubernatorial events, funerals, weddings, and campus events.

Fish Drill Team 
This all-freshman precision rifle drill team represents Texas A&M and its Corps of Cadets in competition with other colleges at military drill meets around the nation. The team has been a part of Corps life for more than 60 years and has won several national championships. Participation involves daily rifle or color guard drill instruction and practice. As with all other Corps activities, poor academic performance results in suspension from participation. 

The team began when the freshmen were moved from the main campus to deal with the overcrowding and hazing issues that followed World War II and the return of war veterans to the A&M campus.  The freshmen were moved to the Riverside Campus Annex and lived in the dorms of the retired Bryan Air Force Base twelve miles from campus.  They were bussed to class each day, but primarily lived in isolation from the rest of the Corps. Out of boredom, the freshmen organized themselves into the Freshman Drill Team and made their debut performance among the jeers and laughter of their upperclassmen. By the end of the performance however, the team received a standing ovation.

The Fish Drill Team is open to any freshman in the Corps who is willing to accept the challenges of being on the team. At the beginning of each season, the team consists of about 150 Fish Drill Team candidates. However, by the end of the first semester, and after grade cutoffs, the number of candidates has usually dwindled down to about 45.

The Fish Drill Team competes in precision drill competitions around the United States each year and represents the Corps of Cadets and Texas A&M. They have won numerous national championships, including five consecutive national titles at the National Cherry Blossom Festival in Washington, D.C. from 1968 to 1972. The national precision drill championship hosted at the National Cherry Blossom Festival was discontinued in 1974.

With the absence of a national drill meet, the Fish Drill Team continued winning. The team won 16 consecutive Texas State Champion titles. In 1997, the team was put on hiatus for four years due to leadership concerns and issues, most notably hazing of students. The team was reinstated in the spring of 2002 with the Class of 2005. However, the Class of 2006 was the first team to compete since reinstatement, taking 2nd place at the national competition. Since then the Fish Drill Team has won the overall national title every year, except 2009, when the team placed 2nd, and 2021, when the competition was not held due to COVID, including their most recent win at the 2022 Mardi Gras Drill Meet hosted by Tulane University NROTC.

The Fish Drill Team portrayed the United States Marine Corps Silent Drill Platoon during the opening segment of the 1992 film A Few Good Men.

Corps Athletics 
Corps athletic teams compete against university club teams across the nation. The following sports (both male and female) are represented in the Corps of Cadets athletic program:

Baseball
Basketball
Golf 
Lacrosse 
Marathon
Marksmanship
Soccer
Tennis
Triathlon

Formed in 2012, the Corps of Cadets Marksmanship Unit (CCMU) is the Corps competitive shooting team, partaking in competitions throughout the state of Texas and across the country. They compete in a wide variety of shooting fields, including the following: SASP, 3gun, Trap and Skeet, and USPSA. The selection process for new freshmen is very strenuous, with over 200 applicants and less than 15 are selected (some with no shooting experience). That being said, in the team's 8 years of being active, they have accumulated over 8 national titles against colleges across the country, including West Point.

ROTC special units 
There are many special units under the different ROTC programs at the corps. The Aggie Warrior Battalion, the Midshipmen Battalion and the Air Force Detachment 805 are part of their ROTC programs.

Rudder's Rangers is named for James Earl Rudder, commander of the 2nd Ranger Battalion that stormed the beaches at Normandy.  Upon retirement from the military, Rudder became the 16th president of Texas A&M University. Rudder's Rangers trains volunteer Army ROTC cadets and prepares them to take part in some of the Army's special training schools, such as Airborne School, Air Assault School, and eventually Ranger School.  This training happens over a year-long process, during which cadets participate in a winter field training exercise at Fort Hood and compete in Texas A&M's Best Ranger Competition.  Cadets meeting the requirements are awarded a pin to wear on their uniform.

Under the NROTC program, SEAL Platoon is a team of cadets that prepares cadets to become Navy SEALs, Navy EOD technicians or Navy Diving Officers. SEAL Platoon meets on weekday mornings as well as other times for special events, such as hell night. SEAL Platoon graduates that are accepted to BUDS have an 85% passing rate through hell week.

In addition to the platoon, the Marine Corps Recon Company is a team of cadets that prepares cadets for the successful completion of the Marine Corps Basic Reconnaissance Course, allowing them to become Force Recon or Recon Battalion members.

The Special Tactics Squadron is a team of cadets that prepares cadets for United States Air Force service within the Special Operations Fields. These Include primarily the Special Tactics Officer (STO), Air Liaison Officer (ALO), and Combat Rescue Officer (CRO). Air Force Special Operations Forces can work as sole units, but are commonly integrated into a US Army Ranger Battalion in special duties. Space Delta Zero is another AFROTC unit affiliated with the United States Space Force.

Parsons Mounted Cavalry 

Parsons Mounted Cavalry preserves the tradition of the cavalry at Texas A&M. The mounted unit was formed in the spring of 1973 to preserve the traditions of the Texas A&M Cavalry of the 1920s and 1930s. The unit also represents the university at parades, agricultural and equestrian events throughout Texas. It is named after Colonel Thomas R. Parsons '49 a former Commandant of Cadets from 1972 - 1978. He was the only active military Commandant at Texas A&M. During his tenure women were accepted in the Corps. "The Cav" marches with the Corps at all home football games.

Within this special unit, Half Section (responsible for Field Artillery and Mule Team elements) also maintains and keeps the "Spirit of '02". This field gun was found in the fall of 1974 at a bonfire cut site near Easterwood Airport. The 'cannon' is driven on a 4 horse team to Kyle Field and fired during all home football games, midnight yell practice, and other special events. Legend has it that the gun was the run away that tumbled over a ridge in the film We've Never Been Licked. Through the dedication and hard work of John Gunter '79 and financing from the Association of Former Students, a limber/caisson was found on a ranch near Georgetown, Texas, wheels made in Oklahoma City, and original McClellan tack was obtained.

Aggie Eagle Post 
Cadets who have earned the Boy Scouts of America, Eagle Scout rank, or the Girl Scouts of the USA, Gold Award, are eligible to join. Members conduct community-wide and scout related service as well as participate in/lead various scouting events at both the state and local level. While the unit has held an active status with the university, the unit was formally reactivated/recognized by the Corps in the Fall of 2015.

Other organizations
AMC Honor Guard
Arnold Air Society
C.A.D.E.T (Cultural Awareness and Diversity Expansion Team)
Color Guard
Corps Center Guard
Cybersecurity Corps Special Unit
Gen. O.R. Simpson Honor Society
Major General T. G. Darling Recruiting Company
Summer Recruiting Company
Society of American Military Engineers

Texas Aggie Corps of Cadets Association 
The Corps of Cadets Association is designed to provide funds to maintain its programs. They provide support to organizations such as the Texas Aggie Band Association, the Ross Volunteer Association, and the Fish Drill Team Association. The Corps Recruiting Program was established in 1988 by order of Major General Thomas Darling as the first organized and professional recruiting for the Corps. Four years later, funds were raised to created the Corps Leadership Outreach Program which would support for the program. On 21 April 1993, the CLO was converted to the Corps of Cadets Association (CCA), receiving its state charter from the State of Texas and being established as a non-profit organization in 1995.

Hall of Honor 
The Corps of Cadets Hall of Honor was established in 1993 to recognize former Corps members who "exemplify the Aggie Spirit". It is hosted at the Sam Houston Sanders Corps of Cadets Center in College Station, Texas. As of 2018, it features 171 inductees whose portraits, biographies, and plaques are on display.

Notable members
Colonel Robert "Danny" Barr – Air Force One pilot for Presidents George H. W. Bush and Bill Clinton.

See also

 Fightin' Texas Aggie Band
 Texas A&M Singing Cadets
 Virginia Tech Corps of Cadets
 MSC Student Conference on National Affairs
 Texas A&M University
 Texan Corps of Cadets

Notes

References

External links

 Texas A&M University Corps of Cadets
 Texas Aggie Corps of Cadets Association
 Texas A&M Army ROTC
 Texas A&M Naval ROTC
 Texas A&M Air Force ROTC
 Corps of Cadets Athletics Program

Military education and training in the United States
Texas culture
Corps of Cadets
ROTC programs in the United States
Military academies of the United States
Texas A&M University traditions
Military units and formations established in 1876
1876 establishments in Texas
Military schools in Texas